Membrane-associated transporter protein (MATP), also known as solute carrier family 45 member 2 (SLC45A2) or melanoma antigen AIM1, is a protein that in humans is encoded by the SLC45A2 gene.

Function 
SLC45A2 is a transporter protein that mediates melanin synthesis. It may regulate the pH of the melanosome, affecting tyrosinase activity. SLC45A2 is also a melanocyte differentiation antigen that is expressed in a high percentage of melanoma cell lines. A similar sequence gene in medaka fish, 'B,' encodes a transporter that mediates melanin synthesis. Mutations in this gene are a cause of oculocutaneous albinism type 4. Alternative splicing results in multiple transcript variants encoding different isoforms. Protein expression is localized to the melanosome, and analysis of the by knockdown of RNA expression leads to altered melanosome pH potentially altering tyrosinase function by affecting copper binding.

In melanocytic cell types, the SLC45A2 gene is regulated by microphthalmia-associated transcription factor.

SLC45A2 has been found to play a role in pigmentation in several species. In humans, it has been identified as a factor in the light skin of Europeans and as an ancestry-informative marker (AIM) for distinguishing Sri Lankan from European ancestry. Mutations in the gene have also been identified as the cause of human Type IV oculocutaneous albinism. SLC45A2 is the so-called cream gene responsible in horses for buckskin, palomino and cremello coloration, while a mutation in this gene underlies the white tiger variant. In dogs a mutation to this gene causes white fur, pink skin, and blue eyes.

SLC45A2 was identified as a melanoma tumor-associated antigen with high tumor specificity and reduced potential for autoimmune toxicity, and is currently in clinical development as a target for T-cell based immunotherapy.

See also 
 Solute carrier family

References

Further reading

External links 

  GeneReviews/NCBI/NIH/UW entry on Oculocutaneous Albinism Type 4

Solute carrier family